Daniel H. Miller (died 1846) was an American politician from Pennsylvania who served as a Jacksonian member of the U.S. House of Representatives for Pennsylvania's 3rd congressional district from 1823 to 1831.

Daniel H. Miller was born in Philadelphia, Pennsylvania.  His birth date is unknown.

Miller was elected as a Jackson Democratic-Republican to the Eighteenth Congress; reelected as a Jacksonian to the Nineteenth, Twentieth, and Twenty-first Congresses.  He died in Philadelphia in 1846.

Sources

The Political Graveyard

Politicians from Philadelphia
1846 deaths
Year of birth unknown
Democratic-Republican Party members of the United States House of Representatives from Pennsylvania
Jacksonian members of the United States House of Representatives from Pennsylvania
19th-century American politicians